Olga Korotayeva (born 3 April 1980) is a Kyrgyzstani freestyle swimmer. She competed in the women's 800 metre freestyle and women's 4 × 200 metre freestyle relay events at the 1996 Summer Olympics held in Atlanta, Georgia, United States.

References

External links
 

1980 births
Living people
Kyrgyzstani female freestyle swimmers
Olympic swimmers of Kyrgyzstan
Swimmers at the 1996 Summer Olympics
Place of birth missing (living people)